Lino Businco (20 July 1908 – 3 March 1997) was an Italian writer. His work was part of the literature event in the art competition at the 1936 Summer Olympics.

References

1908 births
1997 deaths
20th-century Italian male writers
Olympic competitors in art competitions
Writers from the Province of Modena